The Saoud bin Abdulrahman al-Thani Stadium, also known as Al-Wakrah SC Stadium, is a multi-purpose stadium in Al Wakrah, Qatar. It is currently used mostly for football matches. It is the home venue of Al-Wakrah Sports Club. The stadium has a capacity of 12,000 seats.

A new stadium named Al Janoub Stadium is being built in the vicinity in time for the 2022 FIFA World Cup and will be used as Al-Wakrah Sports Club’s home, after the world cup.

During the 2022 FIFA World Cup, the site was used as the training base for England.

References

Football venues in Qatar
Multi-purpose stadiums in Qatar
Al-Wakrah SC
Sport in Al Wakrah